The European turtle dove (Streptopelia turtur) is a member of the bird family Columbidae, the doves and pigeons. It breeds over a wide area of the south western Palearctic including north Africa but migrates to northern sub-Saharan Africa to winter.

Taxonomy
The European turtle dove was formally described by the Swedish naturalist Carl Linnaeus in 1758 in the tenth edition of his Systema Naturae. He placed it with all the other pigeons in the genus Columba and coined the binomial name Columba turtur. The specific epithet turtur is the Latin word for a turtle dove. Linnaeus gave the locality as "India". This was an error and the type locality has been designated as England. The species is now placed in the genus Streptopelia that was introduced in 1855 by the French ornithologist Charles Lucien Bonaparte.

Four subspecies are recognised:

 European turtle dove (S. t. turtur) (Linnaeus, 1758) – Europe, Madeira and the Canary Islands to western Siberia
 Persian turtle dove (S. t. arenicola) (Hartert, 1894) – Northwest Africa to Iran and western China
 Saharan turtle dove (S. t. hoggara) (Geyr von Schweppenburg, 1916) – Air Massif and Hoggar Mountains  (southern Sahara)
 Egyptian turtle dove (S. t. rufescens) (Brehm, CL, 1845) – Egypt and northern Sudan

Despite the identical spelling, the "turtle" of the name, derived from Middle English , derived from Old English  (male turtle dove),  (female turtle dove), ultimately derived from Latin , has no connection with the reptile; "turtle" in this case came originally from Latin , which is onomatopoeic to represent the bird's song. The genus name Streptopelia is from Ancient Greek  meaning "collar" and  meaning "dove".

A few other doves in the genus Streptopelia are also commonly called "turtle doves":

 the Asian Oriental turtle dove S. orientalis and red collared dove S. tranquebarica.
 the African dusky turtle dove S. lugens and Adamawa turtle dove S. hypopyrrha.
A few other species from the related Nesoenas and Spilopelia genera, which were both formerly included in the genus, also possess common names containing the term 'turtle dove'.

Description
Smaller and slighter in build than many other doves, it measures  in length,  in wingspan and weighs . The European turtle dove may be recognised by its browner colour, and the black-and-white-striped patch on the side of its neck. The tail is notable as the bird flies from the observer; it is wedge shaped, with a dark centre and white borders and tips. When viewed from below, this pattern, owing to the white under-tail coverts obscuring the dark bases, is a blackish chevron on a white ground. This can be seen when the bird stoops to drink and raises its spread tail.

The mature bird has the head, neck, flanks, and rump blue grey, and the wings cinnamon, mottled with black. The breast is vinaceous, the abdomen and under tail coverts are white. The bill is black, the legs and eye rims are red. The black and white patch on the side of the neck is absent in the browner and duller juvenile bird, which also has the legs brown.

Distribution and status
The turtle dove is a migratory species with a western Palearctic range covering most of Europe and the Middle East and including Turkey and north Africa, although it is rare in northern Scandinavia and Russia. It winters south of the Sahara.

The turtle dove, one of the latest migrants, rarely appears in Northern Europe before the end of April, returning south again in September.

It is a bird of open rather than dense woodlands, and frequently feeds on the ground. It will occasionally nest in large gardens, but is usually extremely timid, probably due to the heavy hunting pressure it faces during migration. The flight is often described as arrowy, but is not remarkably swift.

The nuptial flight, high and circling, is like that of the common wood pigeon, but the undulations are less decided; it is accompanied by the whip-crack of the downward flicked wings. The arrival in spring is heralded by its cooing or purring song, a rather deep, vibrating "".

Populations of turtle dove are in rapid decline across Europe and this species has red list conservation status globally. In the United Kingdom its numbers have declined by 93% since 1994 and across Europe numbers fell by 78% 1980–2013.

Environmentalist groups have said that the decline of turtle doves in Europe is partly because changed farming practices mean that the weed seeds and shoots on which it feeds, especially fumitory, are scarcer, and partly due to shooting of birds in Mediterranean countries. According to a 2001 study cited by the European Commission, between two and four million birds are shot annually in Malta, Cyprus, France, Italy, Spain and Greece. Environmentalists have described spring hunting in Malta as particularly problematic as it is the only country with an EU derogation to shoot birds during their spring migration to breeding grounds.

According to a 2007 study by the European Commission, four currently identifiable potential threats to the turtle dove are (1) habitat loss/modification (medium to low impact), (2) droughts and climate change (mostly unknown but likely low impact), (3) hunting (partly unknown but overall medium impact), and (4) competition with the collared dove (unknown impact). The British Trust for Ornithology has also highlighted Trichomonosis parasite as a threat to the turtle dove.

In culture

According to Aelian, the turtle dove was sacred to Demeter.  In Roman mythology, the turtle dove was one of the emblems of Fides, the goddess of trust and good faith.

Perhaps because of Biblical references – especially verse 2:12 from the Song of Songs – its mournful voice, and the fact that it forms strong pair bonds, European turtle doves have become emblems of devoted love. In the New Testament, two turtle doves are mentioned as the customary offering during the Presentation of Jesus at the Temple.  In Renaissance Europe, the European turtle dove was envisaged as the devoted partner of the Phoenix. Robert Chester's poem Love's Martyr is a sustained exploration of this symbolism. It was published along with other poems on the subject, including William Shakespeare's poem "The Phoenix and the Turtle", where "turtle" refers to the turtle dove.

The turtle dove is featured in a number of folk songs about love and loss, including "There Is a Tavern in the Town". One of these is a setting by Ralph Vaughan Williams.

Turtle doves are also featured in the song, "The Twelve Days of Christmas", as the gift "my true love gave to me" on the second and subsequent days of Christmas.

Turtle doves appear in the title and lyrics of the spiritual "Turtledove Done Drooped His Wings" from the Georgia Sea Islands.

In the Shaker hymn "In Yonder Valley", that "the turtledove is in our land" is seen as a good omen and sign of growth.

See also
 Nesoenas, a genus sometimes included with turtle-doves
 Spilopelia, a related genus of doves with different morphology and behavior

References
Notes

Bibliography

External links

 Xeno-canto: audio recordings of the European turtle dove
 Ageing and sexing by Javier Blasco-Zumeta & Gerd-Michael Heinze
 Feathers of turtle dove (Streptopelia turtur) 

Birds of Europe
Birds of North Africa
Birds of the Canary Islands
Birds of Central Asia
Birds of Western Asia
Birds of Africa
European turtle dove
European turtle dove
European turtle dove